The Pasterze, at approximately 8.4 kilometres (5.2 mi) in length, is the longest glacier in Austria and in the Eastern Alps. It lies within the Glockner Group of the High Tauern mountain range in Carinthia, directly beneath Austria's highest mountain, the Grossglockner. The length of the glacier is currently decreasing by about 50 m (160 ft) each year. Its volume has diminished by half since the first measurements in 1851.

Geography

The Pasterze forms the source region of the Möll river, a left tributary of the Drava. Its waters also feed the Margaritze reservoir, used to generate electricity at the Kaprun hydropower plant north of the Alpine crest.

Indeed the detection of wood, peat and pollen in the area of the retreating glacier indicate vegetation and also the use as pastureland during the last interglacial period until about 1,500 BC.

The surrounding area was purchased by the German and Austrian Alpine Club in 1918; today the glacier is part of the High Tauern National Park. The Pasterze is a major tourist destination, accessible via the scenic Grossglockner High Alpine Road and a funicular railway that leads down to its margin.

See also
List of glaciers
Retreat of glaciers since 1850
Effects of global warming

External links

 Pasterze Glacier Trail
 Pasterze funicular railway
 Surround photography of Pasterce Glacier
 Multi-temporal satellite view of Pasterze Glacier

Glaciers of Austria
Landforms of Carinthia (state)
Glaciers of the Alps
Glockner Group
Tourist attractions in Carinthia (state)